ITU-R BT.1886 is the reference EOTF of SDR-TV. It is a gamma 2.4 transfer function (a power law with a 2.4 exponent) considered as a satisfactory approximation of the response characteristic of CRT to electrical signal. It has been standardized by ITU in March 2011. It is used for Rec. 709 (HD-TV) and Rec. 2020 (UHD-TV).

Definition 
BT.1886 EOTF is as follows:

where

  is the screen luminance, in cd/m2. 
  is the input video signal level, in the range .
  is the exponent of the power function and equal to 2.4
  is the variable for user gain (legacy “contrast” control)
  is the variable for user black level lift (legacy “brightness” control) 
  is the screen luminance for white, in cd/m2. 
  is the screen luminance for black, in cd/m2. 
According to ITU, for a better match,  can be set to 0.1 for moderate black level settings (e.g. 0.1 cd/m2) or to 0 for lower black levels (e.g. 0.01 cd/m2).

An alternative EOTF has also been provided by ITU for the cases a more precise match of CRT characteristics is required.

See also 

 Gamma correction
Transfer functions in imaging

References 

ITU-R recommendations
Transfer functions
Display technology